The Grip of the Yukon is a 1928 American silent Western film directed by Ernst Laemmle, the nephew of Universal Pictures founder Carl Laemmle. The film starred Francis X. Bushman and Neil Hamilton, and is based on a story by William MacLeod Raine, "The Yukon Trail, A Tale of the North".

Plot
An old-time Alaskan miner dies and leaves his fortune and holdings to his daughter in the states. She comes north and is befriended by two old friends of her father. And she needs all the befriending they can provide as a true-blue villain has designs on her holdings and attributes.

Cast
 Francis X. Bushman - Colby MacDonald
 Neil Hamilton - Jack Elliott
 June Marlowe - Sheila O'Neil
 Otis Harlan - Farrell O'Neil
 Burr McIntosh - Chardon, hotelkeeper
 James Farley - Sheriff

Preservation status
The Grip of the Yukon is now presumed lost. However, a 16mm print of the film may exist.

References

External links
 
 

1928 films
1928 Western (genre) films
1920s adventure drama films
American adventure drama films
American black-and-white films
Films based on short fiction
Films set in Yukon
Lost Western (genre) films
Universal Pictures films
Films directed by Ernst Laemmle
Lost American films
1928 lost films
1928 drama films
Silent American Western (genre) films
1920s American films
Silent adventure drama films
Silent American drama films
1920s English-language films